In enzymology, an opheline kinase is an enzyme that catalyzes the chemical reaction

ATP + guanidinoethyl methyl phosphate  ADP + N'-phosphoguanidinoethyl methylphosphate

Thus, the two substrates of this enzyme are ATP and guanidinoethyl methyl phosphate, whereas its two products are ADP and N'-phosphoguanidinoethyl methylphosphate.

This enzyme belongs to the family of transferases, specifically those transferring phosphorus-containing groups (phosphotransferases) with a nitrogenous group as acceptor.  The systematic name of this enzyme class is ATP:guanidinoethyl-methyl-phosphate phosphotransferase.

References

 

EC 2.7.3
Enzymes of unknown structure